Commonwealth MRT station is an above-ground Mass Rapid Transit (MRT) station on the East West line in Queenstown, Singapore located at Commonwealth Avenue near the junction of Commonwealth Drive. The station serves the residential neighbourhoods of Commonwealth and Tanglin Halt. The station is in the vicinity of schools such as New Town Primary School, CHIJ Kellock, Faith Methodist Church, and Queensway Secondary School.

The residential estates and station bearing the same name were named after Commonwealth Avenue built around 1963, which in turn was named after the British Commonwealth of Nations. Commonwealth station is a transport node for residents in the vicinity of Commonwealth Avenue, serving adjacent schools, places of worship, housing developments and businesses.

History

On 5 January 1985, Lim Kah Ngam and Aoki had won Contract 203 for the construction of Commonwealth and Buona Vista stations together with the viaduct from Queensway to Clementi Road.  The station opened on 12 March 1988, as part of the extension of the MRT system from Outram Park to Clementi.

Commonwealth had however retrofitted with platform screen doors from January 2011 and started operations on 28 April that year together with Queenstown, and the fans began operating on 25 June 2012 together with Buona Vista station.

A new overhead bridge and two new exits were constructed starting mid-2012 and opened on 23 August 2015, the same day as Queenstown MRT station.

References

External links

 

Railway stations in Singapore opened in 1988
Queenstown, Singapore
Mass Rapid Transit (Singapore) stations